Ukraine competed at the 2019 World Aquatics Championships in Gwangju, South Korea from 12 to 28 July.

Medalists

Artistic swimming

Ukraine entered 12 artistic swimmers.

Women

 Legend: (R) = Reserve Athlete

Diving

Ukraine entered 9 divers.

Men

Women

Mixed

High diving

Ukraine qualified two male and one female high divers.

Men

Women

Open water swimming

Ukraine qualified one male and one female open water swimmers.

Men

Women

Swimming

Ukraine entered six swimmers.

Men

References

World Aquatics Championships
Nations at the 2019 World Aquatics Championships
2019